William Mackay Mackenzie (1871–1952) was a Scottish historian, archaeologist and writer, who was Secretary of the Royal Commission on Ancient and Historical Monuments of Scotland between 1913 and 1935, and also an expert on folk-lore. He was born in Cromarty, graduated with an MA from the University of Edinburgh and taught at Glasgow Academy between 1896 and 1912. He also had a DLitt.

In 1925-1926 he was Rhind lecturer in archaeology at the University of Edinburgh and during the Second World War acted as head of the department of Ancient Scottish History. In 1942 he was appointed to be a member of the Commission where he had formerly been Secretary.  He was a Fellow of the Society of Antiquaries of London (FSA) and was made an honorary Doctor of Laws in 1949 at Edinburgh. As well as writing on medieval history, he published a major edition of Dunbar's poems.  His younger brother, Donald Alexander Mackenzie, was also a prolific writer on religion, mythology and anthropology.

Public Recognition

A portrait of Mackenzie by David Foggie, painted in 1914, is held by the National Gallery of Scotland but is rarely displayed.

Bibliography

References

The Scotsman: 18 April 1935, 6 March 1943, 9 July 1949

External links

 

1871 births
1952 deaths
20th-century Scottish historians
Alumni of the University of Edinburgh
Academics of the University of Edinburgh
People associated with the University of Edinburgh School of History, Classics and Archaeology
Fellows of the Society of Antiquaries of London